Papua New Guinea competed at the 2010 Summer Youth Olympics, the inaugural Youth Olympic Games, held in Singapore from 14 August to 26 August 2010.

Medalists

Athletics

Boys
Track and Road Events

Football

Girls

Group A

 Qualified for semifinals

5th place contest

Swimming

Weightlifting

Boys'

References

External links
Competitors List: Papua New Guinea – Singapore 2010 official site

2010 in Papua New Guinean sport
Nations at the 2010 Summer Youth Olympics
Papua New Guinea at the Youth Olympics